Diploclisia glaucescens is an extensively spreading climber found in South Asia, Southeast Asia, China, Indonesia and the Philippines.

References

External links

Menispermaceae